Price-101 Freeway/Apache Blvd  is a light rail station on Valley Metro Rail in Tempe, Arizona, United States. It is the first station of the westbound line within the city of Tempe, and is located a few hundred feet east of Loop 101/Price Freeway. This station is a park and ride station.

Ridership

Bus connections 
 40
 Express: 511

References

External links
 Valley Metro map

Valley Metro Rail stations
Railway stations in the United States opened in 2008
2008 establishments in Arizona
Buildings and structures in Tempe, Arizona